is a 2006 Japanese film by director Naoto Kumazawa and produced by Shunji Iwai (who also co-wrote the screenplay under pseudonym Aminosan). Kumazawa had worked with Iwai before, having directed the making-of documentary for Swallowtail Butterfly.

Plot
Tomoya Kishida (Hayato Ichihara) is working as a staffer in a television studio when he hears about the death of his close friend, Aoi Sato (Juri Ueno). This sparks his recollection of the events in life they shared from meeting at a record store, shooting a short film as part of their university film club, to saying their last goodbyes. 
The movie moves through their times together. They initially meet while Kishida is stalking Aoi's friend. Initially  repelled by the awkward Kishida, Aoi uses Kishida in a student film. They make the film together, and Aoi is forced to step in as the lead, whereupon she kisses Kishida. They eventually spend a lot of time together and start to get close, until Aoi decides to go overseas. Kishida gets a job at the television studio, while Aoi leaves to further her career and broaden her horizons.
Though in love with each other, neither had the courage to confess their feelings before it was too late.

Cast
Hayato Ichihara
Juri Ueno
Yū Aoi
Ami Suzuki

External links
  
 
 

2006 films
2000s romance films
Japanese romance films
2000s Japanese-language films
Films about filmmaking
Films about blind people
Films produced by Shunji Iwai
2000s Japanese films